Ab Gui (also Romanized as Āb Gū’ī; also known as Ābkūhī) is a village in Emad Deh Rural District, Sahray-ye Bagh District, Larestan County, Fars Province, Iran. At the 2006 census, its population was 20, in 5 families.

References 

Populated places in Larestan County